Hard fat may refer to:

 Fatback, a specific cut of pork.
 Solid fat, such as fully hydrogenated vegetable oil.